Saskatoon Silver Springs was a provincial electoral district for the Legislative Assembly of Saskatchewan, Canada. The district included the neighbourhoods of Silverspring, Forest Grove, Evergreen, Willowgrove, Erindale and Arbor Creek.

This constituency was created by the Representation Act, 2002 (Saskatchewan) out of portions of the Saskatoon Meewasin and Saskatoon Sutherland ridings. It was dissolved by the Representation Act, 2013 (Saskatchewan) into Saskatoon Silverspring-Sutherland and Saskatoon Willowgrove.

Election results 

|-

 
|NDP
|Cindy Lee Sherban
|align="right"|2,242
|align="right"|21.62
|align="right"|-5.85

|- bgcolor="white"
!align="left" colspan=3|Total
!align="right"|10,371
!align="right"|100.00
!align="right"|

|-

 
|NDP
|Gord Bedient
|align="right"|3,060
|align="right"|27.47
|align="right"|-11.52

|- bgcolor="white"
!align="left" colspan=3|Total
!align="right"|11,139
!align="right"|100.00
!align="right"|

|-

 
|NDP
|Russell Scott
|align="right"|3,490
|align="right"|38.99
|align="right"|–

|- bgcolor="white"
!align="left" colspan=3|Total
!align="right"|8,952
!align="right"|100.00
!align="right"|

References

External links 
Website of the Legislative Assembly of Saskatchewan
Elections Saskatchewan: Official Results of the 2007 Provincial Election By Electoral Division
Elections Saskatchewan - Official Results of the 2011 Provincial Election
Saskatchewan Archives Board – Provincial Election Results By Electoral Division

Former provincial electoral districts of Saskatchewan
Politics of Saskatoon